Edgardo Vega Yunqué (May 20, 1936August 26, 2008) was a Puerto Rican novelist and short story writer, who also used the Americanized pen name Ed Vega.

Early years 
Edgardo Vega Yunqué was born in Ponce, to Alberto Vega, a Baptist minister, and Abigail Yunqué, and lived in Cidra, Puerto Rico, until his family moved to the South Bronx in 1949. Even as a child he loved to read, and became familiar with many of the great European works. His seminal influences included Miguel de Cervantes, Azorín, Borges, Unamuno, Lope de Vega, Victor Hugo, and members of the Generation of '27 literary movement.

Upon graduating from high school in 1954, he joined the United States Air Force. During his free time Vega focused on reading and analysis of American literature, after finding a large collection of books at his sister's house.

After his Air Force service, Vega attended Santa Monica College, and eventually got his degree from New York University. He dropped out of school temporarily after the assassination of U.S. President John F. Kennedy, and worked in East Harlem as part of the war on poverty.

Vega was married to Pat Vega née Patricia Jean Schumacher on December 31, 1961; their marriage ended in divorce in 1997. They had three children: Alyson, Matthew, and Tim. Vega was also the stepfather of Suzanne Vega.

Work 
Vega focused on writing since 1972 and published his first short story "Wild Horses" in Nuestra Magazine in 1977. He wrote fourteen novels and three story collections. He said that he often worked on several books at once and had no problem keeping track of them:  Since my work is about people and my affection for them, I don't lose track of who they are just like I don't lose track of my children or other relatives and acquaintances. I have friends – and characters – whom I don't see for a long time, but as soon as we get together we pick up where we left off.

Vega's literary influences were subtle and complex. In addition to William Faulkner, John Steinbeck, Ernest Hemingway, and the magic realist writers, he was heavily influenced by Holocaust literature and by the concern of the Irish members of his childhood neighborhood, for the independence and reunion of their native country.

Vega's published fiction includes the novels The Comeback, Blood Fugues, The Lamentable Journey of Omaha Bigelow into the Impenetrable Loisaida Jungle, and No Matter How Much You Promise to Cook or Pay the Rent You Blew It Cauze Bill Bailey Ain't Never Coming Home Again. His short story collections include Mendoza's Dreams and Casualty Report, which were adapted for the stage and anthologized internationally.

Reception

Bill Bailey

Critical reception of the novel No Matter How Much You Promise to Cook or Pay the Rent You Blew It Cauze Bill Bailey Ain't Never Coming Home Again was generally positive. The New York Times Book Review called it "a powerhouse of a novel ... it brings vividly to life, with its polyphony of voices, the simmering ethnic stew of the great American city", but also noted "flat-footed dialogue" and "the characters' belabored internal commentaries", saying "[t]he climax is so ghastly that the book never quite regains its equilibrium." Booklist hailed it as a "hypnotically readable novel--about jazz, about race, about coming-of-age, and above all, about New York ... honest, wrenching emotion, free of all artifice ... Vega Yunqué may just be the Thomas Wolfe of the multicultural twenty-first century."

The Washington Post described it as "a sprawling, iconoclastic, ambitious, stunningly written novel that is part picaresque, part bildungsroman, and part recapitulation of America's last half century ... Like jazz and like America, this novel is fluid, unpredictable, full of verve and smarts. But it is not merely an entertainment. Deeply revisionist, tinged with tragedy and yet doggedly optimistic, this is a work that belongs on the shelf with its epic siblings: E.L. Doctorow's Ragtime and Thomas Pynchon's Vineland."

Newsday found it "juicy, sprawling ... Yunqué succeeds brilliantly." The New York Post called it "a profound novel in the tradition of Ralph Ellison and William Faulkner." The novel also won the  PEN Oakland/Josephine Miles Literary Award and The Washington Post Book of the Year Award.

Omaha Bigelow

Vega's reputation grew with The Lamentable Journey of Omaha Bigelow into the Impenetrable Loisaida Jungle. Kirkus Reviews declared the book a "raucous outing ... his characters hold forth in hilarious broken Spanglish ... vivid, wry, tragicomic ... Vega Yunqué is a potent talent." According to Booklist, Vega's "ribald and rambling style reverberates throughout his third novel ... he deftly skewers the politics of academia, the tyranny of mediocrity in contemporary American literature, and America's ongoing prejudice against Puerto Ricans. Vega, unlike many formulaic novels he disparages, definitely has a lot to say." Publishers Weekly announced that "Vega Yunqué has a keen intelligence, an ear for dialogue and a flair for zany passages of magic realism."

Blood Fugues

His subsequent novel Blood Fugues solidified Vega Yunqué's international reputation as a literary novelist. Publishers Weekly wrote that "Yunqué writes with grace, vividly evoking New York City and American life." Booklist announced "the author is a bravura storyteller with an extraordinary ability to create fascinating, emotion-engaging characters...the novel's subplots involving political terrorism and immigrant resistance to imposed assimilation are absolutely relevant to today's America." Kirkus Reviews noted the book's "distinctive architecture,  mystery and suspense," that it was "highly descriptive," and contained "all the features of fine drama."

Short story collections

Vega's short story collections also met with critical acclaim. The San Francisco Chronicle announced that in Mendoza's Dreams Vega "shows us, in twelve funny and personality-laden tales, that there is indeed much more to life in Spanish Harlem than gang warfare; set to the strains of Bernstein and Sondheim." Kirkus Reviews called Mendoza's Dreams "a dozen loving comic fables about the Puerto Rican experience in New York City…well-written, affecting and gritty tales of El Barrio life: reality beginning in dreams. The Village Voice Literary Supplement found Casualty Report to be "brilliantly traced ... a multivocal journey through layers of miscegenated consciousness, intensely bound to a nation that often works like a dream."

Library Journal praised Vega's portrayal of "the consuming struggles and sorrows of Puerto Ricans in New York ... the stories betray a deep concern and love for people living precariously between two worlds. A fine, provocative addition for Latino and large general fiction collections."

Activism and advocacy 
Vega was the campaign manager for the first political campaign of New York State Assemblyman Nelson Antonio Denis, and served as the first Executive Director of the El Barrio Local Development Corporation (EBLDC).

He taught creative writing at the Latin American Writers Institute, the Teachers & Writers Collaborative, the New School for Social Research, as well as at Hostos Community College, Hunter College, and SUNY Old Westbury.

He also served as Director of the Clemente Soto Vélez Cultural and Educational Center, and as a counselor to ASPIRA and the Addiction Service Agency.

Death

Vega died on August 26, 2008, from a possible thrombosis at NYU Lutheran Medical Center in Brooklyn, New York and was buried at Calverton National Cemetery in Calverton, New York.

At the time of his death, Vega had completed the novel How That Dirty Rotten Charlie Maisonet Turned Me into a Puerto Rican Sex Freak, which was later published under the title Rebecca Horowitz, Puerto Rican Sex Freak. Vega was also finishing the story collection A Place of Remembrance on an Island Called Regret and the nonfiction book Spic, Writing Under the Threat of Censorship in the United States: A Jeremiad.

His obituary in The New York Times hailed Vega's honesty and his "picaresque, combustive and sometimes flamboyantly comic expressions of the Puerto Rican experience in New York’s multicultural maelstrom."

David Gonzalez of The New York Times blogged, "his novels captured the crazy glory of this city and its people, with jazzy riffs and elegant solos that flowed with rhythm. His words could dazzle, amuse and even infuriate."

The New York Daily News noted that Mr. Vega had authored 17 novels.

Major works 
His first novel and both short story collections were published under the name "Ed Vega".

Novels
 The Comeback. Houston: Arte Público, 1985.
 No Matter How Much You Promise to Cook or Pay the Rent You Blew It Cauze Bill Bailey Ain't Never Coming Home Again. New York: Farrar, 2003.
 The Lamentable Journey of Omaha Bigelow into the Impenetrable Loisaida Jungle. Woodstock and New York: Overlook, 2004.
 Blood Fugues. New York: Rayo, HarperCollins, 2005.
 Rebecca Horowitz, Puerto Rican Sex Freak (cancelled in last-minute dispute with publisher). 
 Reviewed by Publishers Weekly. 
 Reviewed by Kirkus Reviews.
 Reviewed by Library Journal.

Short story collections
 Mendoza's Dreams. Houston: Arte Público, 1987.
 Casualty Report.  Houston: Arte Público, 1991.

Awards 
 PEN Oakland/Josephine Miles Literary Award (2004) for No Matter How Much You Promise to Cook or Pay the Rent You Blew It Cauze Bill Bailey Ain't Never Coming Home Again
 The Washington Post Book of the Year Award (2004)

 See also 

 List of Puerto Rican writers
 Puerto Rican literature

References

 Further reading 

 Binder,Wolfgang. "Interview: Ed Vega". American Contradictions: Interviews with Nine American Writers. Eds. Wolfgang Binder and Helmbrecht Breining. Hanover and London: Wesleyan UP, UP of New England, 1995, 125–142.
 "A Hispanic Voice of Satire: Ed Vega's Portrait of the Puerto Rican Community". Voix et Langages aux Etats-Unis. Tome I. Ed. Serge Ricard. Aix-en-Provence: Univ. de Provence, 1993, 229–243.
 Hernández, Carmen Dolores.  "Ed Vega". Puerto Rican Voices in English: Interviews with Writers.  Wesport: Praeger, 1997, 196–225.
 Pérez, Richard.  "Literary Pre/occupations: An Interview with Puerto Rican Author Edgardo Vega Yunqué". Centro Journal 18.1 (2006): 188–205.
 Edgardo Vega Yunqué (1936-) By: David de Posada, IN: West-Durán, Herrera-Sobek, and Salgado, Latino and Latina Writers, I: Introductory Essays, Chicano and Chicana Authors; II: Cuban and Cuban American Authors, Dominican and Other Authors, Puerto Rican Authors. New York: Scribner's; 2004. pp. 1019–1030.

External links
 obituary The New York Times remembrance The New York Times Cityroom blog
 Latin American Writers Institute at Hostos CC
 "A Neighborhood Replete with Ghosts" The New York Times'', June 19, 2005. Retrieved March 6, 2014.

1936 births
2008 deaths
20th-century American novelists
21st-century American novelists
20th-century American short story writers
21st-century American short story writers
American male novelists
American male short story writers
Burials at Calverton National Cemetery
Hispanic and Latino American novelists
Hispanic and Latino American short story writers
New York University alumni
Puerto Rican United States Air Force personnel
Puerto Rican writers
State University of New York at Old Westbury faculty
United States Air Force airmen
Writers from Ponce
PEN Oakland/Josephine Miles Literary Award winners
20th-century American male writers
21st-century American male writers
Novelists from New York (state)
Hostos Community College faculty